Toleration Act may refer to:

 Maryland Toleration Act, a 1649 law mandating religious tolerance for Trinitarian Christians
 Toleration Act 1689, an Act of the Parliament of England
 Toleration Act 1719, an Act of the Parliament of Ireland

See also
 Occasional Conformity Act 1711 or the Tolerance Act